State Highway 261 (SH 261)  is a Texas state highway running from SH 29 north along the western side of Lake Buchanan to the old location of SH 29 at Bluffton.  This route was designated on March 21, 1938. On August 30, 1957, SH 261 was extended west 1 mile over part of RM 2241, which was rerouted north over RM 2337 so that there was one continuous RM road, rather than two, between Llano and Tow.

Junction list

References

261
Transportation in Llano County, Texas